Troy Herring House is a historic home located at Roseboro, Sampson County, North Carolina.   It was built in 1912, and is a two-story, three bay by five bay, Classical Revival style frame dwelling with a truncated hipped roof.  The front features a two-story central portico, with paired and fluted Ionic order columns and a one-story wraparound porch with Ionic order capitals.  The house is similar to one built by Troy Herring's first cousin Robert Herring of Roseboro in 1916.

It was added to the National Register of Historic Places in 1986. This home was salvaged by Giuliano Giannone who salvaged and restored it in 1997 to 1999.

References

Houses on the National Register of Historic Places in North Carolina
Neoclassical architecture in North Carolina
Houses completed in 1912
Houses in Sampson County, North Carolina
National Register of Historic Places in Sampson County, North Carolina
1912 establishments in North Carolina